Grady George Diangana (born 19 April 1998) is a professional footballer who plays as an attacking midfielder for Championship club West Bromwich Albion. He has previously played for West Ham United. Born in the Democratic Republic of the Congo, Diangana represents England at youth international level.

Early life
Diangana was born in the Democratic Republic of Congo. His family moved to the United Kingdom when he was four years old. Diangana grew up in Woolwich, London.

Club career

West Ham United
Diangana joined the West Ham youth system in 2010, aged 12. Originally a striker, he began playing as an attacking midfielder at under-15 level. He made his under-18 debut for the club in February 2014, and his Premier League 2 debut in January 2015. He signed his first professional contract with the Hammers on 14 May 2016. He signed a new two-year contract in June 2018.

On 26 September 2018, Diangana made his first team debut in the EFL Cup against Macclesfield Town, playing the full game and scoring two goals in an 8–0 victory at the London Stadium, in which fellow debutants Conor Coventry and Joe Powell also featured. Three days later, Diangana made his first Premier League appearance, coming on as a 93rd-minute substitute for Felipe Anderson in a 3–1 home victory against Manchester United. Diangana became a regular in the team following an injury to Andriy Yarmolenko, making his first Premier League start against Leicester City on 27 October and registering his first league assist in the following game, against Burnley.
On 18 January 2019, Diangana signed a new six-year contract that would have kept him at West Ham until 2025.

Loan to West Bromwich Albion
On 8 August 2019, Diangana joined West Bromwich Albion on loan until the end of the season He made his West Brom debut on 13 August 2019 in a 2–1 home defeat by Millwall in the first round of the EFL Cup. Diangana scored his first two goals for West Brom on his league debut, on 17 August 2019. Coming on at half-time for Kyle Edwards against Luton Town, scoring two goals in six minutes in a 2–1 win which ended Luton's run of 28 home games unbeaten. Diangana played 30 times in the league for Albion, scoring eight goals as they won promotion to the Premier League. This included a goal and an assist in the final game of the season, a 2–2 draw against Queens Park Rangers as Albion returned to the top flight after a two-year absence.

West Bromwich Albion
On 4 September 2020, West Bromwich Albion announced the signing of Diangana for an undisclosed fee on a five-year deal. The decision to sell him by West Ham chairman David Sullivan was controversial amongst both fans and players. West Ham club captain Mark Noble openly stated that he was "angry and sad that Grady has left" in a comment which gathered support from fellow players including Declan Rice and Jack Wilshere.

Diangana scored his first Premier League goal in a 5–2 defeat to Everton. It was a long-range solo effort from 20 yards out which beat Jordan Pickford into the bottom right hand corner. Despite a difficult start to the season for West Brom, Diangana was a regular starter on the left flank under manager Slaven Bilić.

International career
In November 2018, Diangana received his first international call-up, for England U20, for a game against Germany U20. He made his England debut on 19 November in a 2–0 win against Germany.

In September 2019, Diangana was called into the England U21 team for the first time, for matches against Turkey U21 and Kosovo U21 after impressing with three goals in his first four matches on loan in the Championship with West Bromwich Albion. Diangana made his U21 debut during a 2–1 defeat to the Netherlands in Doetinchem on 19 November 2019.

Style of play
Diangana generally plays as a right-sided attacking midfielder but can play across the forward line. He cites Ronaldinho as an influence. In 2019, after breaking in to the West Ham first team under Manuel Pellegrini, he stated "The manager’s style of play is what I’ve grown up watching and trying to take into my game. For me, it’s been perfect" as well as citing West Ham United Academy coach Trevor Bumstead for encouraging him to express himself from a young age.

Career statistics

References

External links

1998 births
Living people
People from Lubumbashi
English footballers
Democratic Republic of the Congo footballers
Association football midfielders
West Ham United F.C. players
West Bromwich Albion F.C. players
Premier League players
English Football League players
England youth international footballers
Black British sportspeople
Democratic Republic of the Congo emigrants to England